Raktomukhi Neela, (Lit: The Deadly Diamond) is a detective story written by Sharadindu Bandyopadhyay featuring the Bengali detective Byomkesh Bakshi and his friend, assistant, and narrator Ajit Bandyopadhyay and several other story-related characters. It was written in 1937. It was author's 9th work in Byomkesh Bakshi series.

Plot

On a rainy morning, detectives Byomkesh and Ajit are discussing the boring news in the newspaper, when Byomkesh notices an interesting item, the release of a criminal Ramanath Neogi from Alipur Jail ten days previously. Byomkesh tells Ajit that Ramanath was a dangerous jewel thief, who was arrested ten years ago for stealing the Red Amethyst (Raktomukhee Neela) from Maharaj Ramendra Singha, which he considered his lucky charm. Maharaj offered a Rs. 2000 reward for the return of the gem. When Ramanath was arrested, all the gems he had stolen were found except the Red Amethyst. When he was in jail, police received information from the other prisoners that Ramanath still had the gem, but when they searched Ramanath, they didn't find it.

Byomkesh and Ajit hear the sound of footsteps downstairs. Byomkesh guesses that it may be the Maharaj, coming to ask them to investigate the murder of one of his associate, Haripada Rakshit. When Byomkesh opens the door, he finds that his guess is right.  Maharaj reveals that the Haripada had been a criminal years ago, before he became an associate of Maharaj. Haripada promised Maharaj that he would never again engage in criminal activities, and he had been a perfect employee. Then, a few days ago, he was found dead in his own home with his throat cut.

After a thoughtful silence, Byomkesh accepts the case. He asks Maharaj whether he noticed anything unusual about Haripada in the days before the murder. Maharaj tells them that one day Haripada appeared ill when he saw some beggars in his House. Maharaj adds that Haripada asked him if he gave the lost gem back to him now, whether he would give him the Rs.2000 reward. After hearing everything, Byomkesh asks Maharaj to come back in the afternoon; he will have solved the case by then.

That afternoon, Maharaj, Bidhu Babu (Police-in-charge of the area of murder), Purno Babu (Inspector in charge of the murder case) and Ramanath assemble at the home of Byomkesh.  Byomkesh tells them all that Ramanath kept the gem on his person when he was arrested. When police came to search him, Ramanath gave the gem to his fellow prisoner Haripada to hide in a hidden pocket in his throat. Unfortunately, Haripada was transferred to another jail the next day, along with the gem. After Haripada was released from jail and became the associate of Maharaj, he decided to return the gem to Maharaj. Before he could do that, he was murdered by Ramanath.

After completing his story, Byomkesh starts to describes the negative effect of the Raktomukhee Neela on Ramanath, trying to panic him. He points out that after he stole the gem, he was arrested, and that Haripada was murdered while he had the gem. Finally Ramanath loses his temper and throws down the gem, which he had hidden as a button on his coat.

Byomkesh picks up the Raktomukhi Neela and gives it back to Maharaj, thereby solving the case.

Indian detective novels
Indian short stories
1937 short stories
Bengali-language literature